The canton of Montargis is an administrative division of the Loiret department, central France. Its borders were modified at the French canton reorganisation which came into effect in March 2015. Its seat is in Montargis.

It consists of the following communes:
 
Chevillon-sur-Huillard
Lombreuil
Montargis
Mormant-sur-Vernisson
Pannes
Saint-Maurice-sur-Fessard
Solterre
Villemandeur
Vimory

References

Cantons of Loiret